Nils Erik "Dubbel-Nisse" Nilsson (8 March 1936 – 24 June 2017) was a Swedish ice hockey forward and footballer. Between 1954 and 1967 he played 205 international matches and scored 131 goals, which is the second-best scoring result, behind that of Sven Tumba. He won the world title in 1957 and 1962, finishing second in 1963 and 1967 and third in 1958 and 1965. He competed at the 1956, 1960 and 1964 Winter Olympics, and finished in fourth, fifth and second place, respectively. He was the best forward of the 1960 tournament and was selected to the all-star team at the 1962 World Championships. In 2002, he was inducted into the International Ice Hockey Federation Hall of Fame.

Nilsson won only one national title, in his last season (1969). Yet he was awarded the Guldpucken award in 1966 as the best Swedish player and the Rinkens riddare award in 1967 for sportsmanlike behavior, and was selected to the Swedish all-star team in 1959, 1960, 1962, 1965 and 1967.

Nilsson also played football with Djurgårdens IF, IK Göta and Karlstad BK, and won the national title with Djurgården in 1959. After retiring from competitions he worked as a product developer with Jofa, a Swedish manufacturer of sporting equipment.

Career statistics

International

References

External links

1936 births
2017 deaths
Ice hockey players at the 1956 Winter Olympics
Ice hockey players at the 1960 Winter Olympics
Ice hockey players at the 1964 Winter Olympics
Forshaga IF players
IK Göta Ishockey players
IIHF Hall of Fame inductees
Leksands IF players
Medalists at the 1964 Winter Olympics
Olympic ice hockey players of Sweden
Olympic medalists in ice hockey
Olympic silver medalists for Sweden
People from Forshaga Municipality
Swedish ice hockey centres
Swedish footballers
Allsvenskan players
IK Göta Fotboll players
Djurgårdens IF Fotboll players
Karlstad BK players
Association footballers not categorized by position
Sportspeople from Värmland County